Kargil was a constituency in the Jammu and Kashmir Legislative Assembly of Jammu and Kashmir a north state of India. Kargil is also part of Ladakh Lok Sabha constituency.

Member of Legislative Assembly

 1962: Agha Sayad Ibrahim Shah, Jammu & Kashmir National Conference
 1967: Kachoo Mohammad Ali Khan, Independent
 1972: Kachoo Mohammad Ali Khan, Independent
 1977: Munshi Habibullah, Jammu & Kashmir National Conference
 1983: Munshi Habibullah, Jammu & Kashmir National Conference
 1987: Qamar Ali Akhoon, Jammu & Kashmir National Conference
 1996: Qamar Ali Akhoon, Jammu & Kashmir National Conference
 2002: Haji Nissar Ali, Independent
 2008: Qamar Ali Akhoon, Jammu & Kashmir National Conference
 2014: Asgar Ali Karbalai, Indian National Congress

Election results

2014

See also

 Kargil
 Kargil district
 List of constituencies of Jammu and Kashmir Legislative Assembly

References

Kargil district
Government of Ladakh
Former assembly constituencies of Jammu and Kashmir